Tekellina is a genus of comb-footed spiders that was first described by Herbert Walter Levi in 1957.

Species
 it contains nine species, found in east Asia and the Americas:
Tekellina archboldi Levi, 1957 (type) – USA
Tekellina bella Marques & Buckup, 1993 – Brazil
Tekellina crica Marques & Buckup, 1993 – Brazil
Tekellina guaiba Marques & Buckup, 1993 – Brazil
Tekellina helixicis Gao & Li, 2014 – China
Tekellina minor Marques & Buckup, 1993 – Brazil
Tekellina pretiosa Marques & Buckup, 1993 – Brazil
Tekellina sadamotoi Yoshida & Ogata, 2016 – Japan
Tekellina yoshidai Marusik & Omelko, 2017 – Russia (Far East)

See also
 List of Theridiidae species

References

Further reading

Araneomorphae genera
Spiders of Brazil
Spiders of the United States
Theridiidae